The Battle of Pantoja and Rocafuerte, known also simply as the Battle of Rocafuerte, was a military confrontation between Peru and Ecuador that took place on August 11, 1941, during the Ecuadorian–Peruvian War.

Background
Hostilities between Peru and Ecuador began on July 5, 1941, when fire was exchanged between both parties. By late July, a full-on offensive was being carried out by Peru in the coastal region of southern Ecuador, and fire was being once again (hostilities had occurred in the past) exchanged in the disputed Amazon as well. A ceasefire had been declared by Ecuador, effective on July 31, but skirmishes between both parties continued nevertheless.

Battle
Both parties started exchanging fire at 4 a.m. according to Peru. Who started the attack, however, is disputed by both parties as well. The Ecuadorian outpost, Rocafuerte, was well supplied and in a good position, and the Peruvian outpost, Cabo Pantoja, was on a small island with trees blocking the view located in the Napo–Aguarico confluence. At the time, both outposts were located in what was known as the Status quo line, agreed upon by both countries in 1936 to serve as a provisional border, and were separated by an eponymous bridge. During the battle, Major Arias attempted to negotiate a ceasefire but was unsuccessful in doing so as the Peruvians demanded an unconditional surrender, something he was not authorized to approve. According to Peru, Arias also unsuccessfully attempted to communicate with Major Escalante, who had fled the scene. According to Ecuador, Peru used air support in addition to its frigate to heavily bombard the outpost.

The battle went on for hours, and the Ecuadorian forces were eventually forced to retreat, with Peru eventually overrunning the outpost and capturing several men, including Arias, and by 12 p.m. the Flag of Peru had been risen on the Ecuadorian outpost, ending the battle. Ecuadorian accounts claim that the men had to leave almost naked and extremely unprepared, and that due to the harsh nature of the local environment, six children drowned.

Aftermath
The government of Ecuador, led by Dr. Carlos Alberto Arroyo del Río, signed the Rio de Janeiro Protocol on January 29, 1942, with which Ecuador officially renounced its claim to a sovereign outlet to the Amazon River.

Rosa Panduro District was created in 2014, named after Rosa Panduro, a housewife who participated in the battle along with her husband.

References

Ecuadorian–Peruvian War
1941 in Ecuador
1941 in Peru
Wars involving Peru
Wars involving Ecuador
Pantoja and Rocafuerte
Pantoja and Rocafuerte
Pantoja and Rocafuerte
History of Loreto Region